Ekaterina Alexandrova defeated Aryna Sabalenka in the final, 7–5, 6–0 to win the women's singles title at the 2022 Rosmalen Grass Court Championships. It was her second WTA Tour singles title, and Alexandrova won the title despite being two points from defeat in the first round.

Alison Riske was the defending champion from when the event was last held in 2019, but she chose to compete in Nottingham instead.

Seeds

Draw

Finals

Top half

Bottom half

Qualifying

Seeds

Qualifiers

Draw

First qualifier

Second qualifier

Third qualifier

Fourth qualifier

Fifth qualifier

Sixth qualifier

References

External links
 Main draw

Libéma Open - Singles
2022 Women's Singles